Michael John Warden (born 9 November 1967) is a former Australian first-class cricketer.

Born at Herston in Brisbane, Warden played country cricket for Queensland from 1990 to 1995, later earning a place on the Australian Country Cricket Hall of Fame. During the Australian winter, Warden played club cricket in England for Stand in the Central Lancashire Cricket League from 1993–1998. While in England in 1999, Warden played a single  first-class cricket match for the Marylebone Cricket Club (MCC) against Sri Lanka A at Shenley. In the Sri Lanka A first-innings, he took the wicket of Tillakaratne Dilshan. He wasn't called upon to bat in the MCC first-innings, but did bat in their second-innings, scoring 2 runs before he was dismissed leg before by Ravindra Pushpakumara.

References

External links

1967 births
Living people
People from Brisbane
Australian cricketers
Marylebone Cricket Club cricketers